The  is a 4-laned expressway-standard road in Hitachinaka, Ibaraki, Japan. The section from the origin to Hitachinaka Kaihin Kōen Interchange is a toll road operated by Ibaraki Prefecture Road Public Corporation, and the remaining section from Hitachinaka Kaihin Kōen Interchange to the terminus is a free road managed by Ibaraki Prefecture.

The road is officially designated as Ibaraki Prefecture Route 57, however it is functionally an extension of the Kita-Kantō Expressway and Higashi-Mito Road.

Route description
As of April 2014 the fare on the tolled section is 100 yen for cars and 160 yen for large trucks and buses. Tolls are collected at 2 stations at Hitachinaka Interchange. Through traffic to and from the Higashi-Mito Road pay at a toll gate on the main route (managed by East Nippon Expressway Company), while traffic leaving and entering the Hitachinaka Road via the interchange use separate toll booths on the entrance/exit ramps (these toll booths do not accept ETC). The speed limit is 80 km/h.

History
Construction on the toll road was completed on 22 July 1999. ETC collection systems were installed at the transition point of the toll road to Higashi-Mito Road In April 2014 tolls on large trucks increased by 10 yen to 160 yen for usage of the toll road.

Junction list
The entire toll road is in Ibaraki Prefecture. The route is a direct extension of the Kita-Kantō Expressway. TB = toll gate. 
|colspan="8" style="text-align: center;"|Through to 

|colspan="8" style="text-align: center;"|Through to Ibaraki Prefecture Route 62

References

External links 

 Ibaraki Pref. Road Public Corp.

Toll roads in Japan
Roads in Ibaraki Prefecture